
Gmina Rogowo is a rural gmina (administrative district) in Rypin County, Kuyavian-Pomeranian Voivodeship, in north-central Poland.

Villages
Gmina Rogowo contains the villages and settlements of Borowo, Brzeszczki Duże, Brzeszczki Małe, Charszewo, Czumsk Duży, Czumsk Mały, Huta, Huta-Chojno, Karbowizna, Kosiory, Lasoty, Lisiny, Nadróż, Narty, Nowy Kobrzyniec, Pinino, Pręczki, Rogówko, Rogowo, Rojewo, Ruda, Rumunki Likieckie, Sosnowo, Stary Kobrzyniec, Świeżawy, Szczerby and Wierzchowiska.

Neighbouring gminas
Gmina Rogowo is bordered by the gminas of Brzuze, Chrostkowo, Rypin, Skępe, Skrwilno and Szczutowo.

References
Polish official population figures 2006

Rogowo
Gmina Rogowo